Novovasilyevka is a rural locality (a settlement) in Sverdlovsky Selsoviet, Khabarsky District, Altai Krai, Russia. The population was 51 as of 2013. It was founded in 1908. There is 1 street.

Geography 
Novovasilyevka is located 31 km south of Khabary (the district's administrative centre) by road. Malopavlovka is the nearest rural locality.

References 

Rural localities in Khabarsky District